Mirović is a South Slavic surname. It may refer to:

Bob Mirovic (born 1966), Australian boxer
Goran Mirović (born 1982), footballer
Igor Mirović (born 1968), politician

Croatian surnames
Serbian surnames